Víctor Hugo Moreno (born June 10, 1979 in Puerto Cabello, Carabobo) is a Venezuela former professional baseball player. He was a set-up relief pitcher who bats and throws right-handed. He was signed by the Arizona Diamondbacks as a non-drafted free agent September 5, 1997.

Moreno played minor league baseball for the Diamondbacks, Philadelphia Phillies, Minnesota Twins, Los Angeles Angels of Anaheim and Oakland Athletics systems, before joining the Baltimore Orioles as a non-roster invitee to 2007 spring training.

Professional career

Arizona Diamondbacks

In  Moreno went 1-4 with a 4.04 ERA in  innings pitched in the Dominican Summer League. He went 1-2 with two saves and a 9.90 ERA in 10 innings in the Arizona League.

Philadelphia Phillies

In  he went 3-3 with five saves and a 3.71 ERA in  innings for the Class-A Batavia Muckdogs. Moreno went 1-0 with one save in 10 scoreless innings for the Class-A Lakewood BlueClaws.

Minnesota Twins
Moreno went 3-1 with a 2.03 ERA in  innings for the Class-A Advanced Fort Myers Miracle.

Oakland Athletics

Baltimore Orioles
Moreno played for the Norfolk Tides in  going 2-5 with a 5.06 ERA in 36 games, one for a start.

In a seven-season minor-league career, Moreno has posted a 31-21 record with a 4.20 ERA and 18 saves in 237 appearances.

Mexican Leagues

World Baseball Classic
Moreno also was a member of the Venezuela national team during the 2006 and 2009 World Baseball Classic.

External links
, or Pelota Binaria

1979 births
Living people
Acereros de Monclova players
Arizona League Diamondbacks players
Batavia Muckdogs players
Cardenales de Lara players
Diablos Rojos del México players
Fort Myers Miracle players
Fortitudo Baseball Bologna players
Florida Complex League Phillies players
Lakewood BlueClaws players
Mexican League baseball pitchers
New Britain Rock Cats players
Norfolk Tides players
Pastora de los Llanos players
People from Puerto Cabello
Piratas de Campeche players
Rochester Red Wings players
Sacramento River Cats players
Tigres de Aragua players
Venezuelan expatriate baseball players in Italy
Venezuelan expatriate baseball players in Mexico
Venezuelan expatriate baseball players in the United States
World Baseball Classic players of Venezuela
2006 World Baseball Classic players
2009 World Baseball Classic players